Tebogo Anna Mashego is a South African entrepreneur and industrialist who is co-founder and chief executive officer of Projects Proprietary Limited, a metal fabrication design and  manufacturing company.

Early life
Mashego was born in South Africa in 1982. She attended Sekete IV High School in Rustenburg, North West Province, graduating in 1998. She later married and began working as a human resources officer at a municipality.

Career
In 2004, Tebogo and her husband established Diep K Steel & Aluminum Proprietary Limited. Tebogo managed the business part-time, while still working as a human resources officer for a local government entity. In 2008, she resigned from her job at the municipality to manage her business full-time. The same year, her husband divested from the company.

In 2014, the company re-branded to Ditsogo Projects Proprietary Limited and relocated to the industrial area of Rustenburg. The company is wholly owned and managed by women. Additional personnel and an upgraded business model was credited with a 20% reduction in operational costs.

Mashego promotes inclusive and sustainable industrialization, building resilient infrastructure and fostering innovation (United Nations Millennium Development Goal 9), with sustainable production and consumption patterns (Sustainable Development Goal 12).

In 2014, Tebogo Mashego was named among "The 20 Youngest Power Women In Africa 2014" by Forbes.

See also
 Adiat Disu
 Ada Osakwe
 Susan Oguya
 Nokwanda Mngeni

References

External links
Website of Ditsogo Projects Pty Limited
RDA Aluminium Doors & Windows

Living people
1982 births
South African chief executives
21st-century South African businesswomen
21st-century South African businesspeople
South African women business executives
Women chief executives
South African women company founders
People from North West (South African province)
South African company founders